The 2018 Paris Motor Show took place from 4 October to 14 October. For the first time, it consists in three shows dedicated to automobiles, motorcycles and new mobility.

Introductions

Production cars

Audi A1
Audi E-tron EV
Audi Q3
Audi SQ2
BMW 3 Series (G20)
BMW X5 (G05)
BMW Z4 (G29)
 DS 3 Crossback
Ferrari Monza SP1/SP2
Honda CR-V Hybrid
Hyundai i30 Fastback N
Hyundai i30 N Option

Kia Ceed
Kia Proceed
Lexus RC (refresh)
Mercedes-Benz GLE
Mercedes-Benz EQC
Mercedes-Benz B-Class
Mercedes-AMG A35
Peugeot 508 SW
Peugeot 508 E-Tense 
 Toyota Corolla Touring Sports (E210)
Toyota Yaris GR Sport (European Debut)
VinFast LUX A2.0 Saloon (European Debut)
VinFast LUX SA2.0 SUV LUX (European Debut)

Concept cars

Audi R8 LMS GT3 Evo
Citroën C5 Aircross Hybrid Concept
Peugeot e-Legend concept
Renault EZ Ultimo

Motorsport cars

Citroën C3 WRC (refresh)
Hyundai i20 WRC (refresh)
Hyundai i30 N TCR Touring Car (refresh)
Peugeot 208 WRX FIA European Rallycross Championship
Škoda Fabia R5 WRC-2
Toyota Yaris WRC (refresh)

Exhibitors

Company manufacturers

 Aston Martin
 Audi
 BMW
 Citroën
 FLUTR
 Honda
 Hyundai
 Infiniti
 Isuzu
 Jaguar
 Kia
 Lamborghini
 Land Rover
 Lexus
 Mercedes-Benz
 Peugeot
 Porsche
 Škoda
 Tesla
 Toyota
 Vinfast

References

External links

 Official website 

Motor Show
Paris Motor Show
Paris Motor Show